Chainpura (also known as Bharatpura) is a village in Shankarpura patwar circle in North-West region in Phagi Tehsil in Jaipur district, Rajasthan.

In Chainpura, there are 57 households with total population of 354 (with 54.52% males and 45.48% females), based on 2011 census. Total area of village is 2.47 km2. There is one primary school in Shankarpura village.

References

Villages in Jaipur district